The Northern Virginia Eagles are a rugby league team based in Manassas, Virginia, U.S. The club currently plays in the USA Rugby League (USARL). From 2007 to 2011 they were known as the  Fairfax Eagles and were based in nearby Fairfax, Virginia.

The Fairfax Eagles were founded in 2007 as an expansion team of the American National Rugby League (AMNRL), but did not begin play until the 2008 season. They competed in the AMNRL for three years, making playoff appearances in 2009 and 2010. In January 2011 the Eagles became one of seven teams to depart from the AMNRL to form the new USA Rugby League (USARL), but the team ceased operations before the season. In 2012, new ownership announced the team, reorganized as the Northern Virginia Eagles, would return to the AMNRL for the 2012 season.

In 2014, the Northern Virginia Eagles joined the USA Rugby League (USARL).

History
The team was founded in 2007 by Steven Grant, who was club president. Based in Fairfax, Virginia, they were the AMNRL's second team to be based in the Washington, D.C. area, after the Washington, D.C. Slayers. The Eagles were originally scheduled to join the AMNRL for the 2007 season, but financial issues prevented them from competing.

The Eagles joined the AMNRL for the 2008 season. That year they ended the season with a 3-5 record, finishing 6th overall and missing the playoffs on point differential. In the 2009 season they went 5-3 and advanced to the playoffs, but were defeated by the Aston Bulls in the first round. That year they also played the New England Rugby League representative side in the 2009 Winter Exhibition, winning by a score of 50-10. In the 2010 season they went 2–4 but qualified for the playoffs, losing to the New Haven Warriors in the first round. After the season they joined with the Washington D.C. Slayers to form the DC Internationals representative side for the War at the Shore event in Sea Isle City, New Jersey. The Internationals went on to win the War at the Shore tournament, defeating the New York Knights in the final 10-0.

On January 12, 2011, the Eagles became one of seven teams to leave the AMNRL to form the new USA Rugby League. Prior to the start of the season, however, club president Steven Grant relocated due to work. The team attempted to develop a plan to continue in the USARL, but was unable to find a solution. The club announced it was ceasing operations in April 2011.

The Eagles played most home games at Stratton Woods Park in Herndon in Fairfax County, Virginia. They finished with an all-time record of 11 wins, 19 losses, and 1 draw.

On November 26, 2011, the AMNRL announced that the team, reformed as the Northern Virginia Eagles, would compete in the 2012 season. The team is scheduled to play in Manassas, Virginia and will focus on recruiting new players.

On February 28, 2014, the USA Rugby League announced that the Northern Virginia Eagles would be joining the USARL as a member club.

All-time scoreboard
2008 season

06.07.08 - Eagles 14 - 40 Slayers (MVP Joey Tropea)

06.14.08 - Eagles 22 - 56 Bulls (MVP Andrew Reddy)

06.21.08 - Fight 10 - 36 Eagles (MVP Charles Pramawat)

07.12.08 - Sharks 58 - 28 Eagles (MVP Naysan Eshraghi)

07.19.08 - Bulls 88 - 0 Eagles (MVP John Young)

07.26.08 - Fight 24 - Eagles 34 (MVP Kevin Campbell)

07.26.08 - Slayers 28 - 18 Eagles (MVP John Young)

08.02.08 - Eagles 20 - 0 Raiders (MVP N/A)

Winter Exhibition - 2008

12.13.08 - Bulls 76 - 6 Eagles (MVP Kevin Campbell)

2009 season

06.06.09 - Eagles 12 - 20 Fight (MVP Dain Bentley)

06.13.09 - Axemen 56 - 4 Eagles (MVP Kevin Campbell)

06.20.09 - Eagles 20 - 0 Raiders (MVP N/A)

06.27.09 - Eagles 74 - 6 Wildcats (MVP Joey Tropea)

07.11.09 - Slayers 18 - 20 Eagles (MVP Andrew Panek)

07.18.09 - Eagles 40 - 28 Slayers (MVP Martyn Nicoll)

07.25.09 - Wildcats 18 - 64 Eagles (MVP Chad Culpepper)

08.08.09 - Bulls 52 - 8 Eagles (MVP Chris Ferezan)

08.15.09 - Bulls 20 - 0 Eagles (MVP N/A)

Winter Exhibition - 2009

12.12.09 - Eagles 50 - 10 New England All-Stars (MVP David Lacroix)

2010 season

Preseason Indoor Exhibition

04.03.10 - Fight 0 - 0 Eagles (MVP Anthony Elghossain)

Preseason PBR Cup Exhibition

05.15.10 - Eagles 0 - 26 Washington Irish (Rugby Union)

05.15.10 - Eagles 0 - 42 Fight (MVP Patrick Robinson)

05.15.10 - Eagles 31 - 34 West Potomac (Rugby Union)

05.15.10 - Eagles 15 - 57 Western Suburbs (Rugby Union)

Regular season

06.05.10 - Eagles 16 - 66 Axemen (MVP John Young)

06.12.10 - Eagles 80 - 4 Vipers (MVP Tim Bucher)

06.19.10 - Bulls 96 - 22 Eagles (MVP Craig Webb)

07.10.10 - Vipers 18 - 80 Eagles (MVP Reece Blayney)

07.11.10 - Eagles 30 - 38 Slayers (MVP Dain Bentley)

07.18.10 - Slayers 24 - 16 Eagles (MVP John Young)

07.31.10 - Warriors 80 - 26 Eagles (MVP Entire Team)

2013 season

Regular season

06.08.13 - Bulls 20 - 38 Eagles (MVP Dave "Maca" McLellan)

06.29.13 - Eagles 44 - 26 Raiders (MVP Jakk Kavanagh)

07.13.13 - Dragons 0 - 20 Eagles (MVP Wilis Rodriguez)

07.20.13 - Eagles 38 - 50 Sharks (MVP Chris Ferezan)

07.27.13 - Knights 58 - 4 Eagles (MVP Bryant Alexander)

08.03.13 - Wildcats 20 - 0 Eagles (MVP Travis Cowell)

2014 season

Regular season

05.31.14 - Slayers 42 - 30 Eagles (MVP Bryant Alexander)

06.14.14 - Eagles 24 - 46 Slayers (MVP Ed Fua)

06.21.14 - Eagles 96 - 16 Blues (MVP Bryant Alexander)

06.28.14 - Rebellion 48 - 40 Eagles (MVP Jacob Cobbin)

07.12.14 - Rebellion 70 - 16 Eagles (MVP Travis Cowell)

07.19.14 - Eagles 72 - 28 Blues (MVP N/A)

07.26.14 - Fight 88 - 24 Eagles(MVP Patrick Robinson)

Current 2020 Squad

Honors
2009 - AMNRL quarter finalists
2009 - Winter Exhibition Winners
2010 - AMNRL quarter finalists
2010 - War at the Shore Champions
2013 - AMNRL 7s Tournament finalists
2013 - AMNRL quarter finalists

International caps

 Ryan Burroughs  (5)
 Bryant Alexander  (2)

See also
Rugby league in the United States

References

External links
 Official website

American National Rugby League teams
Sports in Fairfax, Virginia
Rugby clubs established in 2007
Sports teams in Virginia
USA Rugby League teams
Rugby league in Virginia
2007 establishments in Virginia